Thwing may refer to:

Places 
 Thwing, East Riding of Yorkshire, English village, United Kingdom

People 
 Alfred L. Thwing (1876–1945), American lawyer and politician
 Annie Haven Thwing, (1851–1940), American historian and children's author
 Charles Franklin Thwing, (1853–1937), American clergyman and educator
 Edward Thwing (1635–1600), English Catholic priest and martyr
 Thomas Thwing, (1635–1680), English Catholic priest and martyr
 John Twenge, (1319–1379), sometimes called John Thwing

See also 
 Thing (disambiguation)
 Thring, a surname
 Twing